Viktória Pácz (born 24 May 1990 in Tatabánya) is a former Hungarian handball goalkeeper who was most recently under contract with DVSC.

Achievements
Nemzeti Bajnokság I:
Silver Medallist: 2010, 2011
Magyar Kupa:
Silver Medallist: 2011

References

External links
 Viktória Pácz career statistics on Worldhandball.com

1990 births
Living people
People from Tatabánya
Hungarian female handball players
Sportspeople from Komárom-Esztergom County